The 2004 Mountain Dew Southern 500, the 55th running of the event was a NASCAR Nextel Cup Series race held on November 14, 2004, at Darlington Raceway in Darlington, South Carolina. Contested at 367 laps on the 1.366 miles (2.198 km) speedway, it was the thirty-fifth race of the 2004 NASCAR Nextel Cup Series season.

For the 2004 season, a shuffling of the NASCAR schedule saw the race move to November. Track management believed the November date would allow for cooler, more comfortable weather for fans, who had increasingly voiced concerns about the hot, humid, weather. In addition, it meant the race would be part of the new Chase for the Nextel Cup playoff date. Rockingham lost its fall date to Fontana, and the Pop Secret 500 was moved to the prestigious Labor Day weekend date.  The track also installed lights.

Qualifying was canceled due to rain and the starting lineup was set by owner's points. Kurt Busch was the points leader and sat on the front row. Jimmie Johnson of Hendrick Motorsports won the race.

Background

Darlington Raceway, nicknamed by many NASCAR fans and drivers as "The Lady in Black" or "The Track Too Tough to Tame" and advertised as a "NASCAR Tradition", is a race track built for NASCAR racing located near Darlington, South Carolina. It is of a unique, somewhat egg-shaped design, an oval with the ends of very different configurations, a condition which supposedly arose from the proximity of one end of the track to a minnow pond the owner refused to relocate. This situation makes it very challenging for the crews to set up their cars' handling in a way that will be effective at both ends.

The track, Darlington Raceway,  is a four-turn  oval. The track's first two turns are banked at twenty-five degrees, while the final two turns are banked two degrees lower at twenty-three degrees. The front stretch (the location of the finish line) and the back stretch is banked at six degrees. Darlington Raceway can seat up to 60,000 people.

Top 10 results

Race statistics
 Time of race: 4:00:33
 Average Speed: 
 Pole Speed: no time trials
 Cautions: 8 for 47 laps
 Margin of Victory: 0.959
 Lead changes: 27
 Percent of race run under caution: 12.8%         
 Average green flag run: 35.6 laps

References

Mountain Dew Southern 500
Mountain Dew Southern 500
NASCAR races at Darlington Raceway